The 2000–01 season was the 104th season of competitive football in Scotland.

League Competitions

Scottish Premier League

The 2000–01 Scottish Premier League was won by Celtic, 15 points clear of Rangers who finished second. Both teams earned a place in the UEFA Champions League. Hibernian and Kilmarnock finished third and fourth and both therefore earned UEFA Europa League berths. St Mirren were relegated in their first season in the top-flight since the 1991–92 season.

Scottish First Division

Scottish Second Division

Scottish Third Division

Other honours

Cup honours

Individual honours

SPFA awards

SWFA awards

Scottish clubs in Europe

Average coefficient – 5.625

Scotland national team

Key:
(A) = Away match
(H) = Home match
WCQG6 = World Cup Qualifying – Group 6

External links
Scottish Premier League official website
Scottish Football League official website
BBC Scottish Premier League portal 
BBC Scottish Football League portal

Notes and references

 
Seasons in Scottish football